Sardar Patel University Mandi, Himachal Pradesh. Which was earlier known as Sardar Vallabhbhai Patel Cluster University was given the status of Second University of Himachal Pradesh State by Himachal Pradesh Government in April 2022.

References

External links
 Official website

 
Education in Himachal Pradesh
Educational institutions established in 2022